Lithospermum tuberosum, commonly called the southern stoneseed or tuberous stoneseed, is a species of flowering plant in the forget-me-not family. It is native to the Southeastern United States, where it is found in calcareous woodlands.

It produces a cyme of yellow flowers in spring.

It is distinguished from the similar Lithospermum latifolium by having more obtuse leaves, which are clustered in a basal rosette as well as on the main stem.

References

tuberosum
Flora of the Southeastern United States
Flora without expected TNC conservation status